The 2004–05 Terceira Divisão season was the 55th season of the competition and the 15th season of recognised fourth-tier football in Portugal.

Overview
The league was contested by 118 teams in 7 divisions of 10 to 18 teams.

Terceira Divisão – Série A

Terceira Divisão – Série B

Terceira Divisão – Série C

Terceira Divisão – Série D

Terceira Divisão – Série E

Terceira Divisão – Série F

Terceira Divisão – Série Açores
Série Açores – Preliminary League Table

Série Açores – Promotion Group

Terceira Divisão - Série Açores Relegation Group

Promotion Playoff

The last Açores team in the Segunda Divisão competed against the Açores champions of the Terceira Divisão.

Madalena were promoted to the Segunda Divisão and Lusitânia relegated to the Terceira Divisão.

Footnotes

External links
 Portuguese Division Three – footballzz.co.uk

Portuguese Third Division seasons
Port
4